Golubić Hydroelectric Power Plant is a hydroelectric power plant on river Butišnica located in Šibenik-Knin County, in central Dalmatia, Croatia.

The Golubić - Hydroelectric Power Plant is a small high-pressure diversion-type facility harnessing the Butišnica River water. The hydro plant is located 7 km north of the town of Knin, in the village of Golubić.

It is operated by Hrvatska elektroprivreda.

The Krka River catchment Hydropower structures
Golubić Hydroelectric Power Plant
Small Krčić Hydroelectric Power Plant
Miljacka Hydroelectric Power Plant
Roški Slap Hydroelectric Power Plant
Jaruga Hydroelectric Power Plant

See also

Krka

References

Hydroelectric power stations in Croatia
Buildings and structures in Šibenik-Knin County